Lyso can refer to:
 Lutetium-yttrium oxyorthosilicate, known as LYSO, a scintillator crystal.
 Lyso-, prefix applied to phospholipids

See also
Lysol (disambiguation)